Kidwai Nagar Assembly constituency is one of 403 legislative assemblies of the Uttar Pradesh Legislative Assembly. It comes under the Kanpur Lok Sabha constituency. Kidwai Nagar comprises wards 12, 36, 44, 45, 48, 65, 67, 71, 73, 82, 83, 86, 87, 90, 96, 107, and 109 in the Kanpur Municipal Corporation of Kanpur Sadar Tehsil. Kidwai Nagar is the largest assembly constituency in India.

Members of the Legislative Assembly

Election results

 
|-
! style="background-color:#E9E9E9" align=left width=225|Party
! style="background-color:#E9E9E9" align=right|Seats won
! style="background-color:#E9E9E9" align=right|Seat change
|-
|align=left|Samajwadi Party
| align="center" | 3
| align="center" | 1
|-
|align=left|Bharatiya Janata Party
| align="center" | 2
| align="center" | 0
|-
|align=left|Indian National Congress
| align="center" | 0
| align="center" | 1
|-
|align=left|Bahujan Samaj Party
| align="center" | 0
| align="center" | 0
|-
|}

See also
 List of Vidhan Sabha constituencies of Uttar Pradesh

References

External links
 

Politics of Kanpur
Assembly constituencies of Uttar Pradesh